General Sir Harry North Dalrymple Prendergast,  (15 October 1834 – 24 July 1913) was a recipient of the Victoria Cross (VC), the highest and most prestigious award for gallantry in the face of the enemy that can be awarded to members of British and, in imperial times, Commonwealth forces.

Early life
Prendergast was the son of Thomas Prendergast and Caroline Lucy (née Dalrymple). He was educated at Cheam School and then Brighton College and, in later years, was President of their old boys' association. He also attended Addiscombe Military Seminary and the Royal School of Military Engineering. He was commissioned in the Madras Engineers of the Madras Army in 1854, serving in the Persian War before returning to India in 1857.

Victoria Cross action
Prendergast was 23 years old and a lieutenant in the Madras Sappers, Madras Army during the Indian Rebellion of 1857 when the following deeds took place for which he was awarded the VC:

He received his VC from Queen Victoria at the Quadrangle of Windsor Castle on 4 January 1860 along with twenty-four other recipients of the decoration.

Later service
Towards the end of the Indian Rebellion, Prendergast served in the Central Indian campaign, and was invalided home in April 1858 after a serious wound permanently disabled his left arm. He however continued to serve in the Indian Army, and in 1867 was appointed field engineer to the Abyssinian War (1867–68), after which he was promoted to brevet lieutenant-colonel. In 1878 he commanded the Indian engineers sent to Malta and Cyprus at the time of the Congress of Berlin, followed by a number of posts within India. He was promoted major-general in April 1883.

Although only a relatively junior general officer, in October 1885 Prendergast was selected to lead the Burma Field Force in the Third Anglo-Burmese War. He achieved initial success, with Mandalay occupied on 29 November 1885, and was created a Knight Commander of the Order of the Bath (KCB) in recognition. However, with limited resources at his disposal, the subsequent Burmese insurgency campaign went less well, damaging Prendergast's reputation. Although promoted lieutenant-general (1886) and general (1887), he was offered no further senior commands, and he retired in 1892.

In retirement, Prendergast was appointed a Knight Grand Cross of the Order of the Bath (GCB) in the 1902 Coronation Honours list, and was invested by King Edward VII at Buckingham Palace on 8 August 1902. In 1908 he was appointed Colonel-Commandant of the Royal Engineers.

He died aged 78 at Heron Court, Richmond, Surrey, now in London, on 24 July 1913 and is buried in Richmond Cemetery.

His recreations were listed as "boxing, fencing, sword-play, running, cricket, football, hunting and polo".

There is a bronze memorial tablet to him in Brighton College Chapel, but his sword that used to hang above it was stolen.

The medal
In the 1980s the medal, on loan from the Prendergast family to the National Army Museum was suggested to be a copy. However, a subsequent 2020 study of its metal composition demonstrated it was an unusually close match to other Victoria Crosses, and in particular those dated to the same year, suggesting it was in fact genuine. The medal is currently displayed at the Royal Engineers Museum in Chatham, England.

References

Sources
Colonel H M Vibart, The Life of General Sir Harry N D Prendergast, RE, VC, GCB (The Happy Warrior). (Eveleigh Nash, London, 1914)
 Martin D W Jones, 'The War of Lost Footsteps. A Re-assessment of the Third Burmese War 1885–1896.', The Bulletin of the Military Historical Society, xxxx no. 157 (August 1989), pp. 36–40
The Register of the Victoria Cross (This England, 1997)
The Sapper VCs (Gerald Napier, 1998)
Monuments to Courage (David Harvey, 1999)

External links
Royal Engineers Museum Sappers VCs
Location of grave and VC medal (Surrey)

1834 births
1913 deaths
British Army generals
British East India Company Army officers
British Indian Army generals
British military personnel of the Abyssinian War
British military personnel of the Anglo-Persian War
British military personnel of the Third Anglo-Burmese War
British recipients of the Victoria Cross
Indian Rebellion of 1857 recipients of the Victoria Cross
Knights Grand Cross of the Order of the Bath
People educated at Brighton College
Military personnel from Chennai
Royal Engineers officers
Graduates of Addiscombe Military Seminary
Burials at Richmond Cemetery